Byglandsfjorden is a lake in Agder county, Norway.  The  lake lies on the river Otra, primarily in the municipality of Bygland, but the far southern tip of the lake extends into the neighboring municipality of Evje og Hornnes.  The river flows out of the lake Åraksfjorden to the north and into the Byglandsfjorden through a narrow channel, and the southern end of the Byglandsfjorden is marked by a dam along the river.  The villages of Byglandsfjord, Grendi, Longerak, Lauvdal, and Bygland are all located on the eastern shore of the lake along the Norwegian National Road 9.  The western shore of the lake is much more sparsely populated, with County Road 304 following that shoreline.

The SS Bjoren is a wood-fueled steamboat that travels on the Byglandsfjorden in the summers between the villages of Ose (on the Åraksfjorden), Bygland, and Byglandsfjord.  Prior to the opening of the roads along the shoreline, steamboat travel was the main method of transportation for those travelling north through Setesdal.

There is a special relict species of salmon that live in Byglandsfjorden, called bleke.  This species of salmon only occurs right there.  These are salmon which are not wandering, they spend their entire lives in freshwater.

See also
List of lakes in Aust-Agder
List of lakes in Norway

References

Lakes of Agder
Setesdal
Bygland
Evje og Hornnes